Saint-Aubin-en-Bray (literally Saint-Aubin in Bray) is a commune in the Oise department in northern France.

See also
 Communes of the Oise department

References

Communes of Oise